Piotr Szczepański (born 31 July 1988 in Nowe Miasto nad Pilicą) is a Polish slalom canoeist who has competed at the international level since 2004. He has competed in C1 and C2. His partner in the C2 boat since 2009 has been Marcin Pochwała.

He won seven medals at the European Championships with six silvers and one bronze.

At the 2012 Summer Olympics in London he competed in the C2 event together with Marcin Pochwała where they finished in 5th place in the final. They also finished 5th at the 2016 Summer Olympics in Rio de Janeiro.

World Cup individual podiums

References

External links

Polish male canoeists
1988 births
Living people
Olympic canoeists of Poland
Canoeists at the 2012 Summer Olympics
Canoeists at the 2016 Summer Olympics
People from Grójec County
Sportspeople from Masovian Voivodeship